Matteo Nocera (born 16 January 1999) is an Italian professional rugby union player who primarily plays prop for Zebre Parma of the United Rugby Championship.

Professional career 
Under contract with Fiamme Oro, for 2019–20 Pro14 season, he named like Permit Player for Zebre in Pro 14. 

In 2018 and 2019, Nocera was named in the Italy Under 20 squad.  On 26 May hw was called in Italy A squad for the South African tour in the 2022 mid-year rugby union tests against Namibia and Currie Cup XV team.

References

External links 

1999 births
Living people
Italian rugby union players
Rugby union props
Fiamme Oro Rugby players
Zebre Parma players
Sportspeople from Carpi, Emilia-Romagna